Niemirki  is a village in the administrative district of Gmina Jabłonna Lacka, within Sokołów County, Masovian Voivodeship, in east-central Poland.

The locale's designation derives from the Slavic given name Niemir.

References

Niemirki